Danijel Gatarić (born 18 May 1986) is a Bosnian-Herzegovinian and German former footballer who plays as a defensive midfielder or right-back. He is the twin brother of Dalibor Gatarić.

References

External links

1986 births
Living people
German people of Bosnia and Herzegovina descent
German people of Serbian descent
Sportspeople from Banja Luka
Twin sportspeople
German footballers
Association football fullbacks
Association football midfielders
2. Bundesliga players
3. Liga players
1. FC Köln II players
KSV Hessen Kassel players
FSV Oggersheim players
Sportfreunde Lotte players
Rot-Weiß Oberhausen players
Wuppertaler SV players
Hammer SpVg players